Vriesea cacuminis is a plant species in the genus Vriesea and is endemic to Brazil.

References

cacuminis
Flora of Brazil